Pandit Neki Ram was an Indian politician. He was a Member of Parliament, representing Haryana in the Rajya Sabha the upper house of India's Parliament as a member of the Indian National Congress. 

Nekiram Sharma fought against the British throughout his life.  He not only turned down the temptation of the British DC to give 25 marmalades of land, but also said that this entire country is mine, what land will you give me, British.  His great-grandson Parag Sharma and his close former judge Subhash Kaushik said that Pandit Nekiram Sharma was born on 7 September 1887 in Kelanga (Kalinga)village of Bhiwani district to Pandit Hariprasad Sharma.  He got higher education in Sanskrit by staying in Sitapur, Banaras and Ayodha in Uttar Pradesh.  He got an opportunity to meet the country's best leaders Gopal Krishna Gokhale, Lokmanya Bal Gangadhar Tilak, Punjab Kesari Lala Lajpat Rai, Babu Surendra Nath Banerjee and Mahamana Pandit Madan Mohan Malviya on the occasion of the annual session of the Indian National Congress in December 1905 at Banaras.  Inspired by  He came back to his village Kelgaon Lot in 1907 at the age of 20.  In 1907, Bhagat Singh, uncle Sardar Ajit Singh, Lala Lajpat Rai were sent to Mandalay jail by the British Government and prosecuting Lokmanya Tilak in 1908 did not tolerate Nekiram and he became a staunch opponent of the British Government.  When Lokmanya Tilak was sentenced to 6 years of rigorous imprisonment, Nekiram fasted for a day and vowed not to sit peacefully until the British rule was over.  In the heart of Pandit Nekiram, the fire was burning against the atrocities being committed against the people by the British Government.  At one time, he wanted to fight against the British by making a bomb against them, but when he reached Calcutta for this work, he met the Congress leader Babu Surendra Nath Benerjee.  Taught Ahisa the lesson to Panditji.  He was arrested in the Non-Cooperation Movement in 1921 on the call of Mahatma Gandhi, the Father of the Nation.  He first met Mahatma Gandhi during the 1915 Mumbai Congress.  He joined the campaign against untouchability under the inspiration of Gandhiji. Working in the Homerul movement, Nekiram first met Pandit Jawaharlal Nehru in March 1918 at a place called Etawah in Uttar Pradesh.  The visit later turned into a strong friendship. On 30 June 1918, he was arrested along with another leader Asaf Ali in the Homerule movement.

Comrade Omprakash, a historian and philanthropist, says that fearing the popularity of Pandit Nekiram in the Homerul movement, the British wanted to break him by greed or intimidation.  He was proposed by Rohtak English DC Joseph to give 25 marmalade land for free, which was turned down by Pandit Nekiram.  Then he was declared a traitor and threatened to be sent to jail.  Which had no effect on them.

Ambala Divisional Political Conference was convened at Bhiwani on 22 October 1920 to popularize the non-cooperation movement.  In it, at the insistence of Pandit Nekiram, the Father of the Nation Mahatma Gandhi, Shokhat Ali, Mohammad Ali, Molana Abul Kalam Azad and Kasturba Gandhi attended.  At that time there was a attendance of 60 thousand people in this conference, of which 50 thousand were farmers.  Pandit Nekiram Sharma was in the leading role in anti-Rowlatt Act movement 1919, Non-cooperation movement 1920-22, Salt Satyagraha 1930-34, Individual Satyagraha 1940-41 and Quit India movement 1942-44 and spent 2200 days in jail.

References

Rajya Sabha members from Haryana
Indian National Congress politicians
1887 births
1956 deaths
People from Hisar (city)